The Piątkowo transmitter (Polish designation: SLR Piątkowo) is a facility for directional radio and broadcasting of local FM and TV programmes at Piątkowo, a northern residential district of the Polish city of Poznań.

The smaller tower is a 76 metre tall free-standing concrete tower, which was built in 1963. Unlike most concrete telecommunication towers, it has no antenna mast on its top.
The higher tower of Piątkowo transmitter is a 128 metre tall free-standing lattice tower, which was built in 1993. This tower is the second tallest structure in Poznań (a chimney of a power station in the urban part Karolin is taller) and belongs to the tallest free-standing radio towers in Poland.

Programmes transmitted

See also
 List of towers

External links
 http://emi.emitel.pl/EMITEL/obiekty.aspx?obiekt=DODR_W1J
 http://www.skyscraperpage.com/diagrams/?b25864
 http://www.skyscraperpage.com/diagrams/?b26620
 http://radiopolska.pl/wykaz/pokaz_lokalizacja.php?pid=132
 Picture

Towers in Poland
1963 establishments in Poland
1993 establishments in Poland
Communications in Poland
Buildings and structures in Poznań
Towers completed in 1963
Towers completed in 1993